Charles Michael Detwiler (born March 6, 1947) is a former American football defensive back who played four seasons in the National Football League with the San Diego Chargers and St. Louis Cardinals. He played college football at Utah State University and attended Glendora High School in Glendora, California. He was also a member of The Hawaiians of the World Football League. After his playing career ended, he went in to coaching, with stops at, among other places, Stanford University and Emporia State University.

References

External links
Just Sports Stats

Living people
1947 births
Players of American football from New York (state)
American football defensive backs
Utah State Aggies football players
San Diego Chargers players
St. Louis Cardinals (football) players
The Hawaiians players
Sportspeople from Rome, New York